Robert Ballagh (born 22 September 1943) is an Irish artist, painter and designer. He was born in Dublin and studied architecture at the Bolton Street College of Technology. His painting style was strongly influenced by pop art. He is particularly well known for his hyperrealistic renderings of well known Irish literary, historical or establishment figures.

Early life and education
Ballagh grew up in a ground-floor flat on Elgin Road in Ballsbridge, the only child of a Catholic mother and a Presbyterian father who converted to Catholicism, both of whom had played sport for Ireland. He became an atheist while being educated at St Michael's College and Blackrock College.

Career
Before turning to art as a profession, he was a professional musician with the showband Chessmen. He met his future wife Betty when she was 16 years old; she died in 2011. He met artist Michael Farrell during this period, and Farrell recruited him to assist with a large mural commission, which was painted at Ardmore Studios.

Ballagh represented Ireland at the 1969 Biennale de Paris. Among the theatre sets he has designed are sets for Riverdance,I'll Go On, Gate Theatre (1985), Samuel Beckett's Endgame (1991) and Oscar Wilde's Salomé (1998). He has also designed over 70 Irish postage stamps and the last series of Irish banknotes, "Series C", before the introduction of the euro. He is a member of Aosdána. Ballagh's paintings are held in several public collections of Irish painting including the National Gallery of Ireland, the Hugh Lane Gallery, the Ulster Museum, Trinity College Dublin, and Nuremberg's Albrecht Dürer House.

Political and cultural interests
In an interview with The Irish Times, Ballagh ascribes his "political awakening" to hearing news of civil rights protestors in Derry, Northern Ireland being attacked by the Royal Ulster Constabulary (RUC) in 1968. In 1988 he contributed to the West Belfast Féile an Phobail arts festival. In 1989 he was a founder member of the Irish National Congress and chaired it for 10 years.  In 1991, he co-ordinated the 75th anniversary commemoration of the 1916 Easter Rising, during which he claimed he had been harassed by the Special Branch of the Garda Síochána.

He is the president of the Ireland Institute for Historical and Cultural Studies, which promotes international republicanism. It is based at the new Pearse centre at 27 Pearse Street, Dublin. It was birthplace of Pádraig Pearse in 1879.

2011 presidential run rumours
In July 2011 it was reported that he might consider running for the 2011 Irish Presidential election with the backing of Sinn Féin and the United Left Alliance. A Sinn Féin source confirmed there had been "very informal discussions" and that Ballagh's nomination was "a possibility" but "very loose at this stage". However, on 25 July Ballagh ruled out running in the election, saying that he had never considered being a candidate. His discussions with the parties had been about the election "in general" and he had no ambitions to run for political office.

Palestine Solidarity Campaign
That same month, Ballagh broke ranks with his colleagues in the travelling production of Riverdance in their decision to perform in Israel. Ballagh is an active member of the Ireland Palestine Solidarity Campaign, which has insisted that artists and academics participate in boycotts of Israeli businesses and cultural institutions.

Closure of Irish galleries and museums
In July 2012, Ballagh said he was "ashamed and profoundly depressed" at the en masse closure of Irish galleries and museums. He cited an example of some Americans and Canadians on holiday in Ireland. "They described most of the National Gallery as being closed along with several rooms in the Hugh Lane Gallery. I'm glad they didn't bother going out to the Museum of Modern Art in Kilmainham because that's closed too. At the point I met them, they were returning from Galway where they had found the Nora Barnacle Museum closed too." Ballagh condemned the hypocrisy of political leaders, saying: "I know arts funding is not a big issue for people struggling to put food on the table but we are talking about the soul of the nation."

Publications and media
He published his autobiography A Reluctant Memoir in 2018.

In 2019, he appeared as a contestant on RTÉ's Celebrity Home of the Year, where his house finished in second place.

Work in collections
National Gallery of Ireland
Ulster Museum
Hugh Lane Municipal Gallery
Albrecht Dürer House, Nuremberg
Trinity College Dublin
Crawford Art Gallery, Cork
Musée des beaux-arts de La Chaux-de-Fonds

References

1943 births
Living people
Alumni of Dublin Institute of Technology
Aosdána members
Irish designers
20th-century Irish painters
21st-century Irish painters
Irish male painters
Artists from Dublin (city)
Irish stamp designers
People educated at Blackrock College
20th-century Irish male artists